UY Scuti (BD-12°5055) is an extreme red hypergiant or red supergiant star in the constellation Scutum. It is considered one of the largest known stars by radius and is also a pulsating variable star, with a maximum brightness of magnitude 8.29 and a minimum of magnitude 10.56. If placed at the center of the Solar System, its photosphere would at least engulf the orbit of Jupiter.

Nomenclature and history

UY Scuti was first catalogued in 1860 by German astronomers at the Bonn Observatory, who were completing a survey of stars for the Bonner Durchmusterung Stellar Catalogue. It was designated BD-12°5055, the 5,055th star between 12°S and 13°S counting from 0h right ascension.

On detection in the second survey, the star was found to have changed slightly in brightness, suggesting that it was a new variable star. In accordance with the international standard for designation of variable stars, it was called UY Scuti, denoting it as the 38th variable star of the constellation Scutum.

UY Scuti is located a few degrees north of the A-type star Gamma Scuti and northeast of the Eagle Nebula. Although the star is very luminous, it is, at its brightest, only 9th magnitude as viewed from Earth, due to its distance and location in the Zone of Avoidance within the Cygnus rift.

Characteristics

UY Scuti is a dust-enshrouded bright red supergiant and is classified as a semiregular variable with an approximate pulsation period of 740 days.

In the summer of 2012, AMBER interferometry with the Very Large Telescope (VLT) in the Atacama Desert in Chile was used to measure the parameters of three red supergiants near the Galactic Center region: UY Scuti, AH Scorpii, and KW Sagittarii. They determined that all three stars are over 1,000 times bigger than the Sun and over 100,000 times more luminous than the Sun.

A hypothetical object travelling at the speed of light would be observed to take about seven hours to travel along UY Scuti's great circle whereas it would take 14.5 seconds to circle the Sun.

However, the Gaia parallax might be unreliable, at least until further observations, due to a very high level of astrometric noise.

UY Scuti has no known companion star and so its mass is uncertain.

Supernova
Based on current models of stellar evolution, UY Scuti has begun to fuse helium, and continues to fuse hydrogen in a shell around the core.  The location of UY Scuti deep within the Milky Way disc suggests that it is a metal-rich star.

After fusing heavy elements, its core will begin to produce iron, disrupting the balance of gravity and radiation in its core and resulting in a core collapse supernova. It is expected that stars like UY Scuti should evolve back to hotter temperatures to become a yellow hypergiant, luminous blue variable, or a Wolf–Rayet star, creating a strong stellar wind that will eject its outer layers and expose the core, before exploding as a type IIb, IIn, or type Ib/Ic supernova.

See also
 Stephenson 2 DFK 1
 AH Scorpii
 KW Sagittarii

References

Scutum (constellation)
Semiregular variable stars
Scuti, UY
M-type supergiants
Durchmusterung objects
TIC objects
M-type hypergiants